Gonse or Gonsé may refer to
Charles Arthur Gonse (1838-1917), French soldier
Gonse, a village in Burkina Faso
Gonsé, a village in Burkina Faso